Muger (also Romanized as Mūger; also known as Mūger-e Pā’īn) is a village in Chenar Rural District, Kabgian District, Dana County, Kohgiluyeh and Boyer-Ahmad Province, Iran. At the 2006 census, its population was 556, in 122 families.

References 

Populated places in Dana County